West Staffordshire was a parliamentary constituency in Staffordshire which returned two Members of Parliament (MPs) to the House of Commons of the UK Parliament until 1885, and then one member.

History
The constituency was created for the 1868 general election, and abolished for the 1918 general election.

Boundaries 

1868–1885: The Hundreds of Pirehill South, Cuttlestone and Seisdon (excluding the parish of Rushall), and the Townships of Willenhall and Wednesfield.

Members of Parliament

MPs 1868–1885

MPs 1885–1918

Elections

Elections in the 1860s

Elections in the 1870s
Ingram's death caused a by-election.

Elections in the 1880s

Elections in the 1890s 

Bass's death caused a by-election.

Elections in the 1900s

Elections in the 1910s 

General Election 1914–15:

Another General Election was required to take place before the end of 1915. The political parties had been making preparations for an election to take place and by the July 1914, the following candidates had been selected; 
Unionist: Philip Ashworth
Liberal: Beddoe Rees

References

Parliamentary constituencies in Staffordshire (historic)
Constituencies of the Parliament of the United Kingdom established in 1868
Constituencies of the Parliament of the United Kingdom disestablished in 1918